L'Ange-Gardien (French for "the guardian angel") is a municipality in the Outaouais region of Quebec, Canada. It constitutes the easternmost part of Les Collines-de-l'Outaouais Regional County Municipality, north of the Buckingham Sector of the City of Gatineau.

The municipality straddles both sides of the Du Lièvre River. The following communities and villages are within its boundaries:
Glen Almond
Neilon
Ribot

History

In 1861, a parish municipality was formed and named L'Ange-Gardien. In 1869, a post office serving the parish and village was established. In 1881, it was separated from Buckingham Canton and formed into a parish municipality. In 1915, the village of Angers was separated from L'Ange-Gardien.

On January 1, 1975, L'Ange-Gardien, Buckingham, Masson, Notre-Dame-de-la-Salette, Angers, Buckingham-South-East, and Buckingham-South-West were merged to form the City of Buckingham, but because of adverse public reaction, the merger did not last long. On January 1, 1980, the former municipalities of West Buckingham, Buckingham Township, and L'Ange-Gardien Parish were reorganized into the Municipality of L'Ange-Gardien.

Demographics

Mother tongue:
 English as first language: 8.5%
 French as first language: 88.5%
 English and French as first language: 1.6%
 Other as first language: 1.2%

See also
 List of municipalities in Quebec

References

External links
 

Incorporated places in Outaouais
Municipalities in Quebec